Juliet Acheampong  (born 11 July 1991) is a Ghanaian women's international footballer who plays as a midfielder for the Ghana women's national football team. She plays professionally for Ånge IF in the Swedish Damallsvenskan.

International career
As a member of the Ghana women's national football team, she competed at the 2014 African Women's Championship.

Honours

International 
Ghana
 All African Games Gold Medal: 2015
 Africa Women Cup of Nations Bronze  Medal: 2016

See also
List of Ghana women's international footballers

References

External links
 

1991 births
Living people
Ghanaian women's footballers
Ghana women's international footballers
Place of birth missing (living people)
Women's association football defenders
Ånge IF players
Damallsvenskan players
Ghanaian expatriate women's footballers